George Leroy F. Ramsay (born 28 September 1912, date of death unknown) is a Bahamian former sailor who competed in the 1960 Summer Olympics, in the 1964 Summer Olympics, and in the 1968 Summer Olympics.

References

1912 births
Year of death missing
Sportspeople from Nassau, Bahamas
Bahamian male sailors (sport)
Olympic sailors of the Bahamas
Sailors at the 1960 Summer Olympics – 5.5 Metre
Sailors at the 1964 Summer Olympics – 5.5 Metre
Sailors at the 1968 Summer Olympics – Dragon